Douglas County High School was the high school serving Douglas County, Nevada from 1915 to the mid-1950s when it became a middle school. In 1988, the building was retired from educational uses. Designed by prolific Nevada architect Frederic Joseph DeLongchamps, it serves today as both the Carson Valley Museum & Cultural Center and a middle school and is listed on the United States National Register of Historic Places.

Carson Valley Museum & Cultural Center
The Carson Valley Museum & Cultural Center is operated by the Douglas County Historical Society.  The museum's displays include a "Main Street" exhibit with period businesses such as a mercantile, dry goods and drug store, doctor's office, barbershop and newspaper office. Other exhibits include area Basque immigrants, Native Americans, Nevada's wild and free-roaming mustangs.

Douglas High School 
The high school moved to Minden.  It is known as Douglas High School and is still in operation today.

References

External links 

Douglas County Historical Society
Douglas High School
Douglas County School District

National Register of Historic Places in Douglas County, Nevada
Defunct schools in Nevada
Frederic Joseph DeLongchamps buildings
Schools in Douglas County, Nevada
Neoclassical architecture in Nevada
School buildings completed in 1915
School buildings on the National Register of Historic Places in Nevada
1915 establishments in Nevada